The National Premier Leagues NSW Women's, also known as the NPL NSW Women's, are  soccer competitions in New South Wales, Australia. The competition is conducted by Football NSW, the organising body in New South Wales. The league is a subdivision of the second tier National Premier Leagues Women’s structure, which sits below the national W-League.

History
A Football NSW panel completed a review on women's football in NSW in 2013, with a view to staying aligned with the FFA's pathway for women's football. This resulted in an inaugural NPL competition in 2014, with NSW being the first in the country to introduce a women's competition under the NPL banner. The Football NSW Institute were the inaugural champions.

Clubs
The following fourteen clubs are taking part in the National Premier Leagues NSW Women’s for the 2023 season.

Honours

See also
 National Premier Leagues NSW

References

Soccer leagues in New South Wales
Women's soccer leagues in Australia